Adolphe Mendy (born 16 January 1960) is a Senegalese former footballer. He played in 21 matches for the Senegal national football team from 1985 to 1997. He was also named in Senegal's squad for the 1990 African Cup of Nations tournament.

References

External links
 

1960 births
Living people
Senegalese footballers
Senegal international footballers
1990 African Cup of Nations players
1992 African Cup of Nations players
1994 African Cup of Nations players
Place of birth missing (living people)
Association football defenders